The Men's 800m T12 had its first round held on September 8, beginning at 9:40 and its Final held on September 10 at 20:18.

Medalists

Results

References
Round 1 - Heat 1
Round 1 - Heat 2
Round 1 - Heat 3
Final

Athletics at the 2008 Summer Paralympics